The Old Presbyterian Church near Parker, Arizona, also known as Mojave Indian Presbyterian Mission Church, was built in 1917.  It is located in what is now La Paz County, Arizona.  It was listed on the National Register of Historic Places in 1971.

It is not listed for its architecture, but rather for its association with the Mohave people and the Presbyterian Church's influence with them, which started in 1907.

References

Churches on the National Register of Historic Places in Arizona
Presbyterian churches in Arizona
Buildings and structures in La Paz County, Arizona
1917 establishments in Arizona
National Register of Historic Places in La Paz County, Arizona
Mohave tribe